Park Square Historic District may refer to:

Park Square Historic District (Pittsfield, Massachusetts)
Park Square Historic District (Franklinville, New York)